Ricaldo Sherman Glenroy Anderson (born 22 September 1976) was an English first-class cricketer. Born in Hammersmith, he was a right-handed batsman and a right-arm medium-fast bowler. He participated in the 1999 and 2000 County Championships, the 2001 Cricinfo championship and the Frizzell County Championships of 2002 and 2003 before giving up first-class cricket.

Anderson also played in one Twenty20 Cup match in June 2003 for Northamptonshire, having also represented Essex during two non-consecutive tenures throughout a short career. In total, throughout his career, he made eight five-wicket innings, and bowled one ten-wicket match.

External links
 Ricaldo Anderson at ESPNcricinfo

1976 births
English cricketers
Essex cricketers
Living people
Northamptonshire cricketers
Cambridgeshire cricketers